Marc Vouillot (born July 5, 1952) is a French powerlifter and strength coach with an international reputation. He has been called the "Father of French Powerlifting".

Early life
Of French descent, Vouillot was born in Abidjan in Ivory Coast, on July 5, 1952. He moved to Cotonou in Dahomey seven years later because his father was engaged in public works for a French firm, then instrumental in conducting major African construction projects. There, Vouillot first started as a Judoka at the age of 7. In 1963, Vouillot's family relocated to Argenteuil where he was introduced to Olympic Weightlifting by World champion Henri Ferrari.

Powerlifting career
Vouillot has competed in powerlifting for over 30 years and was French national powerlifting champion in 1981, 1982 and 1996. He also competed in many natural bodybuilding contests on national level.

Coaching career
Vouillot has coached many powerlifting champions, including the French super heavy weight Jean-Pierre Brulois, and American Sarah Robertson. He has also worked as a strength and conditioning consultant with a wide range of elite athletes, like the Cuban endurance swimmer Nino Fraguela.

References

Bibliography 
 Marc Vouillot, La Force Athlétique, Paris, Chiron, 2006. 
 Marc Vouillot (and col.), L'Haltérophilie au service de la préparation physique et de la performance, Paris, 2015. 
 :fr:Emmanuel Legeard, Force: Entraînement & Musculation, Paris,  2005. 

1952 births
Living people
French powerlifters
Strength training writers
Strength and conditioning coaches
Male powerlifters